Dudley Conservation Park is a protected area in South Australia on the Dudley Peninsula on Kangaroo Island. It was dedicated in 1970 to conserve Kangaroo Island Narrow-leaved Mallee.

Description
The conservation park's vegetation is mostly an open scrub of Eucalyptus diversifolia and E. rugosa, with E. cneorifolia (the KI Narrow-leaved Mallee for which the park was dedicated) only occurring as an infrequent sub-dominant. There are limestone ridges and sandhill country in the south-eastern corner. The conservation park is classified as an IUCN Category Ia protected area.

References

External links
Entry for Dudley Conservation Park on protected planet

Conservation parks of South Australia
Protected areas established in 1970
1970 establishments in Australia
Protected areas of Kangaroo Island
Dudley Peninsula